The West Indies cricket team toured New Zealand between 5 December 2008, and 13 January 2009. They played two Test matches, two Twenty20 Internationals (T20Is) and five One Day Internationals (ODIs) against the hosts, plus a three-day match against State Championship side Auckland. This was the first series between the sides since the West Indies toured New Zealand in 2005–06; their previous meeting was in the Super 8 stage of the 2007 Cricket World Cup.

New Zealand cricket team

The New Zealand side had just returned from the first leg of a tour to Australia where they played two Test matches against the hosts, losing both. Prior to the second test against Australia, Andy Moles was announced as the replacement for retiring New Zealand coach John Bracewell with the West Indian series to be his first in charge of the team. One of his first moves was to replace a number of support staff and insist that he and captain Daniel Vettori be "the only voices in the dressing room". He also switched the roles of batsmen Daniel Flynn and Jesse Ryder, deciding that Flynn was better suited to the number 3 position and Ryder to the number 5.

At the start of the Test series, the New Zealand team were eighth on the ICC Test Championship rankings.

West Indian cricket team

The West Indies had recently lost all three matches of an ODI series against Pakistan. Their previous Test series was at home to Australia in May and June 2008, when they lost two Tests and drew one. At the beginning of the Test series, they were ranked seventh in the ICC Test Championship, one spot higher than New Zealand.

Squads

The New Zealand team for the Test series was announced on 6 December while the West Indies named their side on 5 November.

First leg

Tour match 

The only warm-up match for the West Indies was a three-day match against State Championship side Auckland. Having lost the toss and been put in to field on a batting-friendly pitch, the West Indian bowlers could only manage two wickets on the first day. Auckland reached 359/2 at stumps with Richard Jones leading the way on 186 not out. On day two Jones continued on to his maiden first-class double century before being dismissed for 201. The Auckland side continued batting until just before tea, declaring at 587/7 once Gareth Hopkins had brought up his century. At stumps on the second day, the West Indian team had reached 82 without losing a wicket. They batted throughout the final day, finishing on a score of 431/7. Ramnaresh Sarwan made the highest score for the West Indians, retiring out on a score of 158. Auckland captain Jones said that they had batted for so long before declaring because he felt that the West Indies weren't going to push for a result either. West Indian fast bowler Fidel Edwards said that the pitch had been "tiring to bowl on" but was a good workout for the bowlers prior to the Test series.

Test Series

1st Test 

On the day prior to the start of the first Test Jacob Oram suffered a calf strain and was unable to recover with Kyle Mills being flown in to replace him. Daniel Vettori won the toss for New Zealand and decided to bat first. The new opening partnership – New Zealand's 18th in 36 Tests – had only put on ten runs before Jamie How got out. Daniel Flynn and Tim McIntosh put on a partnership of 87 until McIntosh was dismissed after lunch followed by Ross Taylor falling to an injudicious shot. Flynn became the first New Zealander to be dismissed under the experimental review system, being given out LBW for 95; when bad light stopped play early, New Zealand were 226/4. There was no action on the second day of the match with the umpires calling off play due to rain. A further session was lost on the third day while the ground was dried, with play beginning at 2:45 pm (just over 3 hours after the scheduled start). Brendon McCullum and Jesse Ryder began well but were both dismissed shortly after the West Indies took the new ball. After some resistance from the final batsmen, New Zealand were dismissed for 365. The West Indian opening batsmen negotiated the 14 overs remaining in the day to be 39 without loss at stumps.

2nd Test

Second leg

Twenty20 Series

1st Twenty20

2nd Twenty20

ODI Series

1st ODI

2nd ODI

3rd ODI

4th ODI

5th ODI

References 

2008 in West Indian cricket
2009 in West Indian cricket
2008 in New Zealand cricket
2009 in New Zealand cricket
2008–09 New Zealand cricket season
International cricket competitions in 2008–09
2008-09